Marc Dragicevic (born 30 March 1981) is an Australian rules footballer who played for Richmond Football Club in the Australian Football League (AFL).

Originally from North Geelong, Dragicevic played for Geelong Falcons before being drafted by Richmond.

A small midfielder, Dragicevic underwent a knee reconstruction in early 2001 which put him out of Richmond's advance to the finals, followed by a second reconstruction. He played five more games before being delisted at the end of the 2004 season.

Following his delisting, Dragicevic signed for St Albans Football Club in the Geelong Football League.

References

External links
 
 

1981 births
Living people
Australian rules footballers from Victoria (Australia)
Richmond Football Club players
Geelong Falcons players
North Geelong Football Club players